Strong Republic is the parliamentary bloc of the Lebanese Forces in the Lebanese Parliament. Headed by Georges Adwan, it consists of 19 deputies after the 2022 general election.

2005–2009 session deputies

2009–2018 session deputies

2018–2022 session deputies

2022–2026 session deputies

See also
 List of members of the 2005–2009 Lebanese Parliament
 List of members of the 2009–2017 Lebanese Parliament
 List of members of the 2018–2022 Lebanese Parliament
 List of members of the 2022–2026 Lebanese Parliament

References 

Lebanese Forces politicians
March 14 Alliance
Politics of Lebanon

Parliamentary blocs of Lebanon